Kumbakonam railway station is a railway station serving the city of Kumbakonam in Tamil Nadu, India. The station is a part of the Tiruchirappalli railway division of the Southern Railway Zone and connects the city to various parts of the state as well as the rest of the country.The station was declared as cleanest railway station in Tamil Nadu and ranked fifth best in the national level in 2016. It is classified as an "'A' category railway station" in the Trichy railway division of the Southern Railway Zone.It is one of the busiest and top revenue generating stations of the Southern Railway zone after Tiruchirapalli TPJ, Thanjavur TJ in Tiruchirapalli division. The Shradha Sethu express connected Kumbakonam to Ayodhya.

History

Swami Vivekananda, on a yatra from Rameswaram, alighted at Kumbakonam station on January 26, 1897, and it was on that day in Kumbakonam that he gave his "Arise, awake and stop not till the goal is reached" speech to spur the people of the nation. A plaque installed by the Railways in the station proclaims the importance of the event.

Development
After serving the railways for decades, the British-era vintage metre-gauge line was scrapped and the last passenger train on those tracks was operated between Kumbakonam and Chennai Egmore on 1 April 2004 following which the broad-gauge tracks were laid.

Gradually, the station came to have several facilities, including water filling for coaches and steam engines to enjoy the status of an important junction. Kumbakonam station developed quickly, and the works were implemented ahead of the Mahamaham festival in 2004.

Now, a total of 36 trains patronise the station every day serving 2500 passengers. Due to the strong patronage by the region's passengers and commuters, Kumbakonam has enjoyed "Grade A" railway station status. Kumbakonam station is also rated as the fifth-cleanest station in India and the cleanest station in Tamil Nadu, according to the survey of major railway stations for cleanliness ranking in 2016 commissioned by the Railways. The Thanjavur District Rail Users' Association honoured the Railway officials and conservancy staff for cleanliness front on the occasion.

Location and layout
The railway station is located off the Kamarajar Road, Kumbakonam.

Lines
 BG single line towards  via Papanasam.
BG single line towards  via Jayankondam (survey completed)
BG single line towards  via Alangudi (survey completed)

Suburban stations
Darasuramn (DSM)
Sundaraperumal Kovil (SPL)
Swamimalai (SWI)
Papanasam (PML)
Thirunageswaram (TRM)
Tiruvidaimaruthur (TDR)
Aduthurai (ATD)

Connections

There are frequent town buses and mini bus services directly connected to Town Bus stand and Central Bus station.

References

External links
 
 

Trichy railway division
Railway stations in Thanjavur district
Railway stations in India opened in 1877
Kumbakonam